Mahamadou is a given name. Notable people with the name include:

Mahamadou Baradji (born 1984), French basketball player
Mahamadou Danda (born 1951), Nigerien who was appointed as Prime Minister of Niger on 23 February 2010
Mahamadou Diarra (born 1981), Malian footballer
Mahamadou Dissa (born 1979), footballer from Mali
Mahamadou Issoufou (born 1951), Nigerien politician who has been President of Niger since 7 April 2011
Mahamadou Djeri Maïga, Vice-President of the Transitional Council of the State of Azawad
Mahamadou N'Diaye (born 1990), Malian footballer
Habi Mahamadou Salissou, Nigerien politician and a former Secretary-General of the centre-right MNSD
Mahamadou Sidibé (born 1978), Malian footballer
Mahamadou Souleymane (born 1984-1986), Tuareg musician
Mahamadou Traoré, Malian professional footballer
Karidjo Mahamadou, Nigerien politician
Ouhoumoudou Mahamadou, Nigerien politician

See also
MAMADOU
Mahama
Mamadou